Los 80 was a Chilean drama TV series for Canal 13 produced to celebrate the Bicentennial of Chile, starring Daniel Muñoz, Tamara Acosta, Daniel Alcaíno, Loreto Aravena, Tomás Verdejo and Lucas Escobar. Although it is clearly inspired by the Spanish series Cuéntame cómo pasó, focusing on the events in Chile, it is not an official remake. The series was renewed for a seventh and last season that aired in Spring-Summer 2014.

Plot
The series, starring Daniel Muñoz and Tamara Acosta, tells the story of the Herreras, a middle-class family living in Santiago of Chile. The plot is set between 1982 and 1989, in the military dictatorship, and revolves around historical events during the 80's, especially the economic crisis of 1982 and the 8.0 magnitude earthquake in Santiago.

Main cast 
 Daniel Muñoz as Juan Herrera González
 Tamara Acosta as Ana López Matamala
 Loreto Aravena as Claudia Herrera López
 Tomás Verdejo as Martín Herrera López
 Lucas Bolvarán as Félix Herrera López
 Daniel Alcaíno as Exequiel Pacheco
 Katty Kowaleczko as Nancy Morales
 Fernando Farías as Don Genaro Manrique
 Diego Navarrete as Hugo "Petita" Manrique
 Pablo Freire as Bruno Mora

Supporting cast  
 Carmen Disa Gutiérrez as Luz Matamala, mather of Ana
 Jorge Yáñez as Ramiro López, father of Ana
 Max Corvalán as Padre Renato, chief teacher of Félix y Bruno
 Gabriela Medina as Doña Imelda
 Cristóbal Alofa as Denin Gallardo
 Natalie Dujovne as Susana
 Víctor Rojas as Padre Enrique, chief teacher of Martín
 Francisco Rodríguez as Francisco Silva, boyfriend of Claudia
 Benito Quercia as Farid Assad, boss of Juan 
 Raimundo Guzmán as Diego Rojas, friend of Martín 
 Mario Soto as TV saler
 Francisco Ossa as Lieutenant of Martín
 Jaime Artus as Cristián Plaza, friend of Martín
 Mario Horton as Gabriel Díaz
 María José Bello as Sandra González, friend of Claudia
 Irene Medina as Pauli, friend of Claudia
 Mario Santander as Ana's gynecologist
 Ernesto Anacona as "Chino", friend of Martín
 Catalina Martin as Pamela "Negra", girlfriend of "Chino"
 Ramón Llao as Manuel, pool saloon owner
 Berta Lasala as Mónica Miranda
 María Ester Mesina as mrs Marta
 Emilia Lara as Paola
 Franco Meershon as Mauricio, boyfriend of Claudia
 Catherine Mazoyer as Gloria, boss of Ana y Nancy
 Heidrun Breier as Madre Teresa, teacher of Félix and Bruno
 Manuel Peña as Roberto Fuenzalida, father of Bruno
 Álvaro Viguera as Fernando Tapia, friend of Gabriel
 Benjamín Velásquez as Nelson, friend of Félix
 Feofrica Larraín as Paty, classmate of Félix 
 Otilio Castro as Pedro Herrera Jr. / Agent Tapia
 Gregory Cohen as Óscar Contardo, medic who helps Claudia
 Cristóbal Muhr as Rucio, friend of Gabriel
 Mauricio Pitta as CNI Agent 
 Francisco González as CNI Agent 
 Carolina Paulsen as Secretary of la Vicaria of la Solidaridad'' Diego Casanueva as Gonzalo, friend of Paola and Martín Patricia Pardo as Enriqueta Amunátegui, mother of Paola Francisca Castillo as Teresa, mother of Camila and Paulina Karina Santoro as Camila von Hummel Antonia Zilleruelo as Paulina von Hummel Benjamín Velásquez as Nelson, friend of Félix Carlos Belmar as Pereira, friend of Félix Gonzalo Robles as Ricardo Assad Nicolás Saavedra as Néstor Díaz Constanza Rojas as Sybilla María Ester Mesina as Mrs Marta Gustavo Becerra as Lucho, maestro Edinson Díaz as Miguel, maestro María José Bello as Sandra González, friend of Claudia Juan Pablo Larenas as Cristóbal, workmate of Martín Karina Santoro as Camila von Hummel Javier Castillo as Daniel, boyfriend of Camila Néstor Cantillana as Mateo González Iván Álvarez of Araya as Luciano Acuña Sergio Piña as Don Roberto Cifuentes, boss of Juan Paulo Meza as Riquelme, workmate of Juan Erto Pantoja as Soto, workmate Juan Claudia Cabezas as Laura, workmate of Ana y Nancy Nathalia Aragonese as Gloria, former lover of Exequiel Verónica Soffia as Macarena Tagle Carolina Arredondo as Erika Rojas Sebastián Arrigorriaga as Félix (2014) Daniela Ramírez as Sybilla (2014) Amaya Forch as Alejandra Hurtado Alejandro Trejo as Milton, neighborhood barber Iván Álvarez of Araya as Luciano Acuña Lux Pascal as Felipe "Axel" Müller Luna Martínez as Susy, friend of Axl Rocío Toscano as Ximena, friend of AxlDevelopment
The first season of the series premiered on October 12, 2008. In this first season, the story is set between 1982 and 1983, starting with Chile's qualification for the 1982 FIFA World Cup, thanks to soccer player Carlos Caszely, and finishing with the first national protest against Augusto Pinochet.

The second season premiered on October 18, 2009. This time, the story is set between 1983 and 1984, starting with a moment that changes the life of the Herrera family, the news of a new baby, and finishing with the birth of baby Ana.

The third season of the series premiered on October 17, 2010 and ended on December 19. Set in 1985, it starts with the 1985 Algarrobo earthquake and ends with Claudia's decision to leave her family, because she's being investigated by the CNI.

The fourth season of the series premiered on October 16, 2011. Set in 1986, it starts with the Herreras  reading the goodbye letter Claudia left and Juan going to Argentina to see her. The season finished on December 20, 2011 with Pedro (CNI agent) torturing Claudia, Gabriel (Claudia's boyfriend) being shot and killed by CNI agents, and Claudia finally returning to her home and hugging her mother.

The fifth season of the series premiered on September 23, 2012. The year is 1987, and it starts with Pope John Paul II's visit to Chile. The fifth season ended on December 16, 2012 with Juan trying to get a job after Ricardo, the son of his former employer, steals all the money Juan and him made from selling a textile factory.  Claudia, recovering from Gabriel's death, tries to go back to medical school, repeating again the PAA (Chilean MCAT). In the meantime, Felix has his first kiss with Sibila.

The sixth season premiered on October 13, 2013. It focuses on 1988's plebiscite of 1988 and the end of Pinochet's dictatorship. The season's finale took place on January 12, 2014.

Finally, in August 2014, Canal 13 announced the seventh season of the series, based on the year 1989, which began to be issued from October 5 and will mark the end of the series. The recordings were completed on Tuesday November 18, 2014, amid tears and hugs.

Chilean television ratings
The pilot episode attracted 2.06 million viewers in Chile, came first in its time slot, leaving behind other programs like Animal Nocturno in the "competitive Sunday night". The season marked a peak audience of 2.7 million and an average rating, in 10 episodes, of 1.9 million viewers. Los 80 was the most watched new series in 2008, averaging a total of 1.92 million viewers.

For the second season, the show continued in the "competitive Sunday night", against Animal Nocturno from TVN and Caiga Quien Caiga from Megavisión, leading the night with a positive margin of 0.7 million viewers. The series popularity increased, and it started having a big cultural impact in people. The season's audience average was 2.54 million viewers. The season had an average rating of 2.54 million viewers. The most watched episode of the season was the season's finale "Nos queremos tanto".

For the third season, the series still led the Sunday nights and became the most watched show of the year, with 2.67 million viewers, winning awards like TV Grama Award and the Copihue de Oro. The season finale attracted 3.2 million viewers. The season's most watched episode was "Familia", the season finale, with an average of 3.25 million viewers and  a peak audience of 4.3 million viewers. This season transformed Los 80'' in the most watched TV show in Chile.

The fourth season increased the popularity of the series even more. This was the most watched season of the series and the most watched show of the year again, averaging a total of 2.98 million viewers, winning more awards like APES Award, Copihue de Oro and TV Grama again. The season's finale "Cuando solo nos queda rezar" had an average of 3.4 million viewers, with a peak audience of 4.4 million viewers. The season's most watched episode was "Madres coraje", which had an average of 3.46 million viewers, making it also the most watched episode of the whole series. This season had an average of 2.98 million viewers, and it was both the most watched season of the series and the most watched TV show in 2011.

For the fifth season, a new time slot led to a decline in the show's popularity and to a decrease in viewers, but the show continued leading the Sunday nights. The season's premiere attracted 2.96 million viewers, and was the lead-out to Pareja Perfecta, which attracted 2.51 million viewers that night. The season's finale attracted 2.61 million viewers, and the season's average was 2.58 million viewers, with a total of 12 episodes. The season's finale "El día más feliz de mi vida" ("The happiest day of my life") had an average of 2.61 million viewers and a peak audience of 3.4 million viewers. The season most watched episode was "Y nada más", which had an average of 3.07 million viewers. The season had an average of 2.58 million viewers.

References

2008 Chilean television series debuts
Canal 13 (Chilean TV channel) original programming
Chilean drama television series
Non-Spanish television series based on Spanish television series